Anton the Terrible is a 1916 American drama silent film directed by William C. deMille and written by Marion Fairfax, Jules Eckert Goodman and Charles Sarver. The film stars Theodore Roberts, Anita King, Horace B. Carpenter, Harrison Ford, Edythe Chapman and Hugo B. Koch. The film was released on September 28, 1916, by Paramount Pictures.

Plot
Cossack Anton Kazoff seeks revenge for the wrongs inflicted on his sister Olga.

Cast 
Theodore Roberts as Anton Kazoff
Anita King as Vera Stanovitch
Horace B. Carpenter as General Stanovitch
Harrison Ford as David Burkin
Edythe Chapman as Babushka
Hugo B. Koch as Grand Duke Ivanovitch
Delia Trombly as Olga Kazoff

Surviving material 
A fragmentary print (footage unknown) is preserved at the British Film Institute/National Film and Television Archive (London).

The Academy of Motion Picture Arts and Sciences archive has 8x10 photographic stills of the film.

References

External links 
 
 
 

1916 films
1910s English-language films
Silent American drama films
1916 drama films
Paramount Pictures films
Films directed by William C. deMille
American black-and-white films
American silent feature films
1910s American films